Albert Marcœur (born 12 December 1947) is a French composer, singer and songwriter. He began his career in the early 1970s. His body of work mixes melodic, rhythmic and sonic experimentations with fancy nursery rhymes, humorous and offbeat lyrics.

Discography

Studio albums 

1974: Albert Marcœur 
1976: Album à colorier
1979: Armes & cycles
1984: Celui où y'a Joseph
1990: Ma vie avec elles
1994: Sports et percussions
1998: m, a, r et cœur comme cœur
2001: Plusieurs cas de figure
2005: L apostrophe
2008: Travaux pratiques
2017: Si Oui, Oui. Sinon Non (with Le Quatuor Béla)

Soundtrack
 1980: Deux Lions au soleil 
 1981: Douce enquête sur la violence 
 1989: Un tour de manège 
 1991: Un enfoiré et quelques connards 
 1998: Mon placard 
 2006: Premonition

References

External links 
 (in French)

1947 births
Living people
Musicians from Dijon
French male singers
French songwriters
Male songwriters
French composers
French male composers